Jared Verlon Crick (born August 21, 1989) is a former American football defensive end. He played college football at the University of Nebraska–Lincoln. The Houston Texans selected him in the fourth round of the 2012 NFL draft.

College career
After being redshirted as a freshman in 2007, Crick played in nine games as a redshirt freshman in 2008, recording two tackles.

As a sophomore in 2009, Crick recorded 75 tackles and nine and a half sacks.
As a junior in 2010, he recorded 9 and a half sacks with 70 tackles. He was then awarded postseason 2nd Team All-American.
As a senior, his season was shortened by a torn pectoral muscle and he entered the NFL Draft. He finished his career with a total of 20 sacks, putting him 8th on Nebraska's all-time list.

Professional career

2012 NFL Draft

Houston Texans
Crick was drafted by the Houston Texans in the fourth round of the 2012 NFL Draft with the 126th overall pick.

After being in a reserved role in 2012 and 2013, Crick emerged as a starter in 2014 and 2015, starting 31 of 32 games played.

Denver Broncos
On April 6, 2016, Crick signed a two-year contract with the Denver Broncos.

On September 15, 2017, Crick was placed on injured reserve after having back surgery.

References

External links

 
 Nebraska Cornhuskers bio

1989 births
Living people
Players of American football from Albuquerque, New Mexico
People from Dawson County, Nebraska
Players of American football from Nebraska
American football defensive tackles
Nebraska Cornhuskers football players
Houston Texans players
Denver Broncos players